Imre Arakas, also known as the butcher, is an Estonian criminal. He has also been a wrestler, an actor and an Estonian separatist. He is a father of two.

Criminal career

Soviet era
In 1979, aged twenty, he and a friend broke into a shooting club in Tallinn and stole 13 handguns and hundreds of rounds of ammunition. Some saw the theft as a blow against the Soviet regime. Arakas was quickly arrested and escaped from the courthouse on 18 April 1979, evading authorities by jumping from the Kohtuotsa viewing platform on Toompea hill. He was arrested again after 87 days and sentenced to 15 years in jail, mostly in  a high-security Russian facility.

Post Soviet crime in Estonia
After release from prison he joined an Estonian organised crime gang and took part in a feud with Russian organised crime that killed over a hundred people. Arakas was nearly killed on more than one occasion.

Spain
He left Estonia for Spain in 1998. A failed assassination attempt was made in Marbella and two Estonians were jailed for their part in it.

After this he became a freelance professional killer who is suspected of being responsible for a number of murders across Europe.

Ireland
He was employed by the Kinahan gang as part of the Kinahan-Hutch feud. He was hired to kill James "Mago" Gately. Arakas owed a lot of money and the €100,000 payment for murdering Gately would pay off a large amount of it. Gardaí received intelligence that he was going to arrive in Ireland and put him under surveillance. The assassination was prevented and in 2018, he was jailed for six years by the Special Criminal Court. While in Mountjoy Prison he suffered a stroke.

Charges in Lithuania
He is expected to be deported to Lithuania after release from prison where he faces murder charges. He is a suspect in the murder of Deimantas Bugavicius, lover of Lithuanian pop star Vita Jakutienė, on 6 November 2015. The victim was shot by a three-man gang. In June 2020 he announced that he would challenge the extradition.

References

1958 births
Living people
Estonian gangsters
Contract killers
Organized crime in Ireland
Fugitives wanted by Estonia
People convicted of attempted murder